John Joseph Connolly Jr. (born August 1, 1940) is an American former FBI agent who was convicted of racketeering, obstruction of justice, and murder charges stemming from his relationship with James "Whitey" Bulger, Steve Flemmi, and the Winter Hill Gang.

State and federal officers had been trying to imprison Bulger for years, but he evaded capture until 2011. As the FBI handler for Bulger and Flemmi, Connolly (who had grown up in the Old Harbor Housing Project with Bulger) had been protecting them from prosecution by supplying Bulger with information about possible attempts to catch them. Connolly was indicted on December 22, 1999, on charges of alerting Bulger and Flemmi to investigations, falsifying FBI reports to cover their crimes, and accepting bribes.

In 2000, Connolly was charged with additional racketeering-related offenses. He was convicted in 2002 and sentenced to ten years in federal prison. In 2008, Connolly was convicted on state charges of second-degree murder in Florida and sentenced to 40 years in prison. He was released from federal prison on June 28, 2011, and transferred to the Florida State Prison to serve the remainder of his sentence for his 2008 conviction.

In April 2020, Connolly asked to be allowed to serve the remainder of his sentence on home confinement due to fears of contracting COVID-19, citing a 2018 federal law allowing for compassionate release under "extraordinary" circumstances, such as age, health and other critical factors. A Miami-Dade judge initially declined to order his release, but Connolly was later granted a medical release on February 17, 2021.

Early life
John Joseph Connolly Jr. is the namesake and son of an Irish immigrant, John Connolly Sr. of Maigh Cuilinn in County Galway, a Gillette employee for 50 years. Connolly's mother, Bridget T. Connolly (née Kelly), was a housewife. They lived in the Old Harbor Housing Project in Boston, the first public housing project in New England, on O'Callaghan Way until John Jr. was 12 years old. The Bulger family, residing a few doors down, had lived there since its New Deal creation in 1938; other residents were future US Representative Joseph Moakley, and Francis "Buddy" Leonard, who would later be allegedly murdered by Bulger in 1975 during his battle for power over the rackets.

Connolly admired the studious William Bulger, six years his senior; he did not meet his older brother, Jimmy, nicknamed "Whitey" because of his white-blond hair, until he was eight years old. The 19-year-old Bulger, who was already notorious as the leader of the Mercer Street gang, bought the other neighborhood boys ice cream cones and convinced an awestruck Connolly to accept the treat. Later that same year, Connolly found himself outnumbered in a skirmish over a ball with some older boys. According to Connolly, Bulger came along and chased the bullies away.

In 1952, Connolly's family moved to the City Point neighborhood of South Boston. John Jr. was able to attend Columbus High School, a Catholic high school in the Italian North End neighborhood. His younger brother, James, who later sought a career in law enforcement, joined the DEA New England Division based in Boston.

Education
Connolly was encouraged to attend Boston College by Billy Bulger, and after graduation, took classes at Suffolk University Law School. He later earned a graduate degree in Public Administration from Harvard University's John F. Kennedy School of Government.

After completing his studies, Connolly worked as a teacher at South Boston High School and at Dorchester High School. After seeking advice from Billy Bulger, now a State Representative, about career opportunities in law enforcement, in 1968, he met with H. Paul Rico's FBI partner, Special Agent Dennis Condon, and Boston Police Department Detective Edward Walsh, an old friend of the Connolly family's. Both Condon and Walsh would later brag that they had "recruited" Connolly. Ironically, Dennis Condon, who was Connelly's FBI supervisor, had approached Whitey Bulger in the early 1970's, with little result. Because of their neighborhood ties, Connolly would prove to have the inside track with Bulger that Condon did not.

On August 1, 1968, U.S. House Speaker John W. McCormack wrote a personal note to J. Edgar Hoover on behalf of a constituent. The letter began, "Dear Edgar, It has come to my attention that the son of a lifelong personal friend has applied to become a special agent of the Federal Bureau of Investigation ..." Connolly was appointed to the FBI in October 1968. FBI Supervisor John M. Morris, who would also later face charges of corruption, was Connolly's supervisor during much of Connolly's time working for the FBI.

FBI career
Connolly began his FBI career in the Baltimore and San Francisco field offices before being transferred to New York City. He wanted to return to Boston to be closer to his ailing father. A year after he arrested Mafioso Frank Salemme, the FBI transferred Connolly to its Boston field office in the John F. Kennedy Federal Building in 1973.

In 1980, he moved to 48 Thomas Park in the Dorchester Heights neighborhood, across the street from South Boston High School. During his career in the FBI, Connolly investigated organized crime. He was one of the primary agents involved in developing the Top Echelon Criminal Informants Program in New England. Over the span of his career he received eight commendations from every Director of the Federal Bureau of Investigation, from J. Edgar Hoover through L. Patrick Gray, William Ruckelshaus, Clarence M. Kelley, James B. Adams, William H. Webster, John Otto, and William S. Sessions. Through his second marriage, he was the brother-in-law of Arthur Gianelli, a racketeer who was later indicted with Joe "Joey Y" Yerardi, who oversaw Johnny Martorano's criminal operations when Martorano was a federal fugitive in Florida between 1978 and 1995.

In 1989, the DEA was probing the Winter Hill Gang for suspected drug trafficking. The DEA was aware that a former roommate and John's brother James both worked for the DEA. As an FBI supervisor later noted in a memo, the head of the DEA's Boston office "quietly changed the duties of both these DEA special agents so they would not become aware of this matter."

Boston FBI Special Agent Robert Fitzpatrick said:

Connolly's dapper, even flashy, appearance meant he stood out as an FBI agent. Bulger poked fun at his foppishness; referring to Connolly as "Elvis" because of his perfectly combed hair.

Before he was brought up on criminal charges, Connolly was mentioned in Gerard O'Neill and Dick Lehr's crime fiction book, The Underboss: The Rise & Fall of a Mafia Family (1989), which followed the FBI's campaign against Gennaro Angiulo with Connolly, John Morris, and a team of fellow FBI agents.

Personal life 

Connolly's first wife, Marianne Lockary, was his childhood sweetheart whom he married as he neared graduation from Suffolk University Law School. In January 1982, he and Lockary, who cited an "irretrievable breakdown" of their marriage after a four-year separation, divorced. In 1988, Connolly married Elizabeth L. Moore, a court stenographer who worked at the FBI headquarters at Government Center, Boston.

Connolly had no children with his first wife but fathered three sons with his second wife, Elizabeth. His sister-in-law Mary Ann Moore is married to Arthur Gianelli. Gianelli and Connolly purchased adjoining properties in Lynnfield, Massachusetts, from Rocco Botta, a reputed Mafia extortionist. Their adjacent homes were built by Thomas F. Tuffo, the real estate partner of Kevin P. O'Neil, who the FBI claimed was a long-time money launderer and enforcer for Bulger and Flemmi.

Meeting Flemmi and Bulger
Connolly first met with FBI informants Stephen Flemmi and Whitey Bulger at a coffee shop in Newton, Massachusetts. Louis Litif, one of the top bookmakers and a Winter Hill Gang mob associate, was one of Connolly's handball partners at the Boston Athletic Club. Bulger nicknamed Connolly "Zip" because the lawman shared the same South Boston ZIP Code as the Bulger clan.

He occasionally lectured FBI agents at the FBI Academy in Quantico, Virginia on informant development tactics and techniques and was a member of the Boston FBI's Organized Crime Squad. Retired FBI Special Agent Joseph D. Pistone wrote in the book, The Ceremony, "The reign of the Patriarca Family is virtually ended. A substantial amount of the credit for the demise of that mob Family must be given to one man, Special Agent John Connolly." Connolly retired from the FBI honorably in 1990 and accepted the position of Director of Security/Public affairs for Boston Edison, from former Boston FBI Special Agent John Kehoe.

Murder trial, conviction, and sentencing
In 2005, Connolly was indicted on murder and conspiracy to commit murder charges in the 1982 slaying of John B. Callahan and the 1981 murder of Roger Wheeler, owner of the World Jai Alai sporting corporation. Connolly stood trial in 2008 in Miami, Florida. Callahan was murdered by John Martorano, who left the corpse in the trunk of a Cadillac in a Miami International Airport parking lot.

Prosecutors alleged that Callahan was killed on the orders of Whitey Bulger and Stephen Flemmi, after Connolly told them that the FBI was investigating Callahan's ties to the Winter Hill Gang in their ongoing investigation into Wheeler's death. Martorano had killed Wheeler in Tulsa, Oklahoma, in May 1981.

During the trial, Bulger associates Flemmi, Martorano, and Kevin Weeks testified for the prosecution detailing Connolly's ties to Bulger and Flemmi. Flemmi testified that he and Bulger paid Connolly $235,000 over the years, but started cutting his payments in the late 1980s after he started attracting attention through too many luxury purchases, including a boat. IRS special agent Sandra Lemansky testified that during the 1980s Connolly bought a 27-foot Sea Ray for $46,567; a South Boston condo for $63,000, with a $12,000 down payment; a Brewster condo for $80,000, with a $15,000 down payment; land in Chatham for $98,000; and then built a house on the Chatham property for $132,000.
During the 1980s, Connolly's annual FBI salary started at $45,000 and gradually increased to $65,000, she said. Denise Taiste, an FBI employee who worked as an assistant to Connolly in 1988 testified that on one occasion when he was not in the office, Connolly instructed her
to leave his paycheck in his desk. Taiste admitted that she looked at the check, which was for $2,078.61, then opened the middle drawer of his desk and saw about 10 more uncashed checks inside.

Bulger's former girlfriend, Theresa Stanley, testified for the defense about her travels with Bulger. Flemmi testified that Connolly warned them that the FBI wanted to question Callahan in the death of Wheeler, and that Callahan "wouldn't hold up" and would probably implicate them. Also testifying against Connolly was his former FBI superior, John Morris, who admitted that he had accepted $7,000 in bribes from Bulger and Flemmi. Morris stated that he began leaking information to them after Connolly delivered a case of wine and an envelope stuffed with $1,000 cash from the pair.

Former U.S. Attorney and current U.S. District Senior Judge Edward F. Harrington testified for the defense, stating that Connolly was a star agent who was credited with using informants to help weaken the New England Mafia.

On November 6, 2008, a jury convicted Connolly of second-degree murder. According to the prosecutors, Connolly faced a possible sentence of 30 years to life in prison. Sentencing was postponed until January 2009, while Circuit Judge Stanford Blake considered a motion by the defense to dismiss the case. The defense argued that in Florida, when Connolly was convicted, the statute of limitations had expired for second-degree murder.

On January 15, 2009, Judge Blake sentenced Connolly to 40 years in prison, saying that Connolly "crossed over to the dark side." The judge agreed with the defense's argument involving the statute of limitations but noted that their motion was past the deadline for such motions. The judge accepted the prosecutors' argument that Connolly abused his badge and deserved more than the 30-year minimum. The 40-year state sentence runs consecutively with the 10-year federal sentence.

Connolly served his time in FCI Butner Low facility at the Federal Correctional Complex, Butner, North Carolina. He was released from federal custody on June 28, 2011 and was transferred to a Florida state prison to serve his 40-year state sentence. Connolly has stated that he had nothing to do with the Callahan murder. With Bulger's capture on June 24, 2011, Connolly's attorney said his client would appeal if Bulger corroborated Connolly's claim of innocence.

On May 28, 2014, Connolly's murder conviction was overturned by a panel of Florida's Third District Court of Appeal by a vote of 2–1. The panel held that since Connolly did not "carry or discharge the gun that was used to kill John Callahan in South Florida", it was not appropriate to convict him of murder. On July 29, 2015, the full court en banc reinstated Connolly's murder conviction by a vote of 6–4, finding that the conviction was legally proper, even though he was on Cape Cod when Martorano killed Callahan. Judge Leslie B. Rothenberg, who had been the lone vote for conviction in the earlier hearing, wrote, "It now no longer matters whether the defendant hired (procured) a hit man, turned to his mob friends to murder Callahan, served as a lookout, provided the gun, or pulled the trigger himself, he is a principal in the first degree." Under Florida sentencing guidelines, Connolly was required to serve at least one-third of his sentence before becoming eligible for parole. 

Connolly was paroled from prison in Florida in 2021 without objection from Callahan's widow after prison officials learned he was gravely ill and possibly had only another year to live. He returned to Massachusetts, but will remain under supervision until 2047. Despite his convictions, Connolly retained and continues to receive, pension benefits from his service as a Federal agent.

See also
 Black Mass (film)
 The Departed

References

External links
 

1940 births
American gangsters of Irish descent
American gangsters
American people convicted of murder
American people of Irish descent
Boston College alumni
Federal Bureau of Investigation agents convicted of crimes
Living people
Harvard Kennedy School alumni
People convicted of murder by Florida
People convicted of racketeering
People from South Boston
Prisoners and detainees of the United States federal government
Winter Hill Gang